Central Ayutthaya is a department store and shopping plaza in Phra Nakhon Si Ayutthaya Province, about  north of Bangkok, Thailand. It can be considered as another big shopping mall of Ayutthaya, and is the 36th branch of the Central Pattana network.

The mall and design 
The mall's building design takes into account the world heritage city of Ayutthaya. The letter A in the nameplate is designed in accordance with the Thai style chedi.

Its façade is white and gold and looks striking modern from a distance, and is designed in the form of twelve indented corners according to the late Ayutthaya architectural style. A side part of the mall at Ayothaya Road, inspired by the plaza of Phra Nakhon decorated with red bricks. These red bricks also represents historical attractions like important ancient sites. Along with a small lotus pond which is another important identity of Ayutthaya.

Its location is a gateway to the provinces of northern and northeastern region.

The mall is also the centre of good stuffs and OTOP from all 16 districts of Ayutthaya under the concept "Capital of Wonders".

The total cost of the shopping complex was 6.20 billion baht (€169 million).

Anchors 
Anchors in the plaza include:

Robinson Department Store
Tops
 Tops Mini
B2S Think Space
Supersports
Power Buy
Food Park
Uniqlo
Jetts Fitness
Pleun Nakhon (Indoor Market)
Ayutthaya Hall
SF Cinema 5 Cinemas

Transportation 
Central Ayutthaya is served by shuttle bus, tuk tuk and minibus from Bangkok.

References

External links 

Shopping malls in Thailand
Central Pattana
Shopping malls established in 2021
2021 establishments in Thailand
Buildings and structures in Phra Nakhon Si Ayutthaya province